KAUN-LD (channel 25) is a low-power television station in Sioux Falls, South Dakota, United States. The station is owned by Jim Simpson. KAUN-LD's transmitter is located on the campus of Sanford USD Medical Center near downtown Sioux Falls.

KAUN-LD (as KAUN-LP) was an Ion Television affiliate until March 2008, when it switched to Retro TV. It later switched to Youtoo America (now YTA TV). As of February 2023, the station is not broadcasting any programming, yet it is still licensed by the Federal Communications Commission (FCC).

References

Retro TV affiliates
AUN-LD
Low-power television stations in the United States
Television channels and stations established in 1984
1984 establishments in South Dakota